Divarilima albicoma is a bivalve that lives in the Florida Keys.

References

Limidae
Molluscs described in 1886